|}
Milton James Ballantyne (5 November 1928 – 15 December 2015) was an Australian politician. He was the Country Liberal Party member for Nhulunbuy in the Northern Territory Legislative Assembly from 1974 to 1980. Ballantyne died in 2015 aged 87.

References

1928 births
2015 deaths
Members of the Northern Territory Legislative Assembly
Country Liberal Party members of the Northern Territory Legislative Assembly